StarNet is a Moldovan Internet service provider.  The company provides Internet services via ADSL and FTTB

History 
Founded on  August 7, 2003, on August 18 was given the license to provide IT services by the National Regulatory Agency in Informational Technologies.

At the end of 2004, it achieves a 30 Mbit/s bandwidth channel and in April 2005 - 55 Mbit/s. In March 2006, the capacity of MD-IX channel has been increased from 100 Mbit/s to 1 Gbit/s. In April 2006, ADSL2+ technology was launched. Also then, was made the first attempt to launch VoIP service, however unsuccessful. The second launch on June 1, 2010 having its trade name as StarVoice.

In May 2006, the number of employers reach 100 people. Also, the external channel has a capacity of 100 Mbit/s.

In August begins the construction of the fiber optic network in district Buiucani. Along with the increasing number of the subscribers, also is increasing the number of the employers, reaching 200 people. On October 25, StarNet company wins the prize “Excellence in Business Management-Europe 2006” offered by the “Magazine of Tourism, Industry & Commerce” from Spain.

By the end of 2008, almost all districts of Chisinau are covered with fiber optic, offering to its subscribers a speed of 100 Mbit/s in the local network. The speed of the external channel reach 2.6 Gbit/s. At the beginning of 2009, external channel gets over 3 Gbit/s.

On March 1, 2011, external channel of StarNet reaches the capacity of 40 Gbit/s.

Notes

Telecommunications companies of Moldova
2003 establishments in Moldova
Telecommunications companies established in 2003